Aedes (Aedimorphus) stenoetrus is a species complex of zoophilic mosquito belonging to the genus Aedes. It is found in Sri Lanka, Thailand, and India.

References

External links
NEW CLASSIFICATION FOR THE COMPOSITE GENUS AEDES (DIPTERA: CULICIDAE: AEDINI), ELEVATION OF SUBGENUS OCHLEROTATUS TO GENERIC RANK, RECLASSIFICATION OF THE OTHER SUBGENERA. AND NOTES ON CERTAIN SUBGENERA AND SPECIES

stenoetrus